Alejandrino Arce (born 11 August 1955) is a Paraguayan footballer. He played in three matches for the Paraguay national football team in 1979. He was also part of Paraguay's squad for the 1979 Copa América tournament.

References

1955 births
Living people
Paraguayan footballers
Paraguay international footballers
Association football defenders